Preacher is an American comic book series published by Vertigo, an imprint of DC Comics.  The series was created by writer Garth Ennis and artist Steve Dillon, with painted covers by Glenn Fabry.

The series consists of 75 issues in total – 66 regular, monthly issues, five one-shot specials, and a four-issue Preacher: Saint of Killers limited series. The final monthly issue, number 66, was published in October 2000, with an epilogue published in Ennis' subsequent series The Boys in February 2009. The entire run has been collected in three series of trade paperbacks, an original run of nine volumes, a second run of six, and three special oversized "Absolute Preacher" volumes.

A television series adaptation, Preacher, aired for 43 episodes over four seasons on AMC, from September 9, 2015 to September 29, 2019.

Plot

Preacher tells the story of Jesse Custer, a preacher in the small Texas town of Annville. Custer is accidentally possessed by the supernatural creature named Genesis, the infant of the unauthorized, unnatural coupling of an angel and a demon. The incident flattens Custer's church and kills his entire congregation.

Genesis has no sense of individual will, but since it is composed of both pure goodness and pure evil, its power might rival that of God Himself, making Jesse Custer, bonded to Genesis, potentially the most powerful being in the universe.

Driven by a strong sense of right and wrong, Custer journeys across the United States attempting to literally find God, who abandoned Heaven the moment Genesis was born. He also begins to discover the truth about his new powers, allowing him, when he wills it, to command the obedience of those who hear and comprehend his words. He is joined by old girlfriend Tulip O'Hare, as well as a hard-drinking Irish vampire named Cassidy.

During the course of their journeys, the three encounter enemies and obstacles both sacred and profane, including The Saint of Killers, an invincible, quick-drawing, perfect-aiming, come-lately Angel of Death answering only to "He Who Sits On The Throne"; a disfigured suicide attempt survivor turned rock-star named Arseface; a serial-killer called the 'Reaver-Cleaver'; The Grail, a secret organization controlling the governments of the world and protecting the bloodline of Jesus; Herr Starr, primary enforcer for The Grail, a megalomaniac with a penchant for prostitutes, who wishes to use Custer for his own ends; several fallen angels; and Jesse's own redneck family — particularly his nasty Cajun grandmother, her mighty bodyguard Jody, and the Zoophilic T.C.

Characters

Collected editions 

Additionally, the book Preacher: Dead or Alive collects Fabry's covers to the series.

Adaptations

Adaptation attempts
Garth Ennis, feeling Preacher would translate perfectly as a film, sold the film rights to Electric Entertainment. Rachel Talalay was hired to direct, with Ennis writing the script. Rupert Harvey and Tom Astor were set as producers. By May 1998, Ennis completed three drafts of the script, based largely on the Gone to Texas story arc. The filmmakers found it difficult financing Preacher because investors found the idea religiously controversial. Ennis approached Kevin Smith and Scott Mosier to help finance the film under their View Askew Productions banner. Ennis, Smith and Mosier pitched Preacher to Bob Weinstein at Miramax Films.

Weinstein was confused by the characterization of Jesse Custer. Miramax also did not want to share the box office gross with Electric Entertainment, ultimately dropping the pitch. By May 2000, Smith and Mosier were still attached to produce with Talalay directing, but Smith did not know the status of Preacher, feeling it would languish in development hell. By then, Storm Entertainment, a UK-based production company known for their work on independent films, joined the production with Electric Entertainment. In September 2001, the two companies announced Preacher had been greenlighted to commence pre-production, with filming to begin in November and Talalay still directing Ennis' script. The production and start dates were pushed back because of financial issues of the $25 million projected budget.

James Marsden was cast in the lead role as Jesse Custer sometime in 2002. He explained, "It was something I never knew anything about, but once I got my hands on the comic books, I was blown away by it." In a March 2004 interview, Marsden said the filmmakers were hoping for filming to start the following August. With the full-length film adaptation eventually abandoned with budgetary concerns, HBO announced in November 2006 that they commissioned Mark Steven Johnson and Howard Deutch to produce a television pilot. Johnson was to write with Deutch directing. Impressed with Johnson's pilot script, HBO had him write the series bible for the first season. Johnson first planned "to turn each comic book issue into a single episode" on a shot-for-shot basis. "I gave [HBO] the comics, and I said, 'Every issue is an hour'. Ennis said 'You don't have to be so beholden to the comic'. And I'm like, 'No, no, no. It's got to be like the comic'."

Johnson also wanted to make sure that one-shots were included as well. Johnson changed his position, citing new storylines conceived by Ennis. "Well, there would be nothing new to add if we did that, so Garth [Ennis] and I have been creating new stories for the series," he said. "I love the book so much and I was telling Garth that he has to make the stories we are coming up with as comics because I want to see them." By August 2008, new studio executives at HBO decided to abandon the idea, finding it too stylistically dark and religiously controversial. Columbia Pictures then purchased the film rights in October 2008 with Sam Mendes planned to direct. Neal H. Moritz and Jason Netter would have produced the film. The previous scripts written by Ennis would not have been used.

AMC television series

On November 16, 2013, it was announced that AMC would be shooting a pilot for Preacher. On November 18, 2013, Bleeding Cool confirmed that Seth Rogen and Evan Goldberg had developed the series pilot with Sam Catlin, and that it would be distributed by Sony Pictures Television. On February 7, 2014 it was made public that AMC was officially developing the series to television based on the pilot written by Seth Rogen and Evan Goldberg. Rogen had no plans to co-star in the series. On May 9, 2014, AMC announced that Preacher was picked up to series. Preacher was slated to premiere mid to late 2015, as announced by Seth Rogen, with the script for the series complete and the pilot ordered by the studio. Comic creators Steve Dillon and Garth Ennis were to work on this project as co-executive producer. On April 17, 2015, Seth Rogen tweeted that Dominic Cooper was cast in the role of Jesse Custer, Joseph Gilgun as Cassidy, Ruth Negga as Tulip O'Hare, Ian Colletti as Arseface, and W. Earl Brown as Sheriff Hugo Root. On September 9, 2015, Seth Rogen announced via Twitter that the series ordered to a ten-episode first season and was due to premiere in mid-2016. The series premiered on AMC on Sunday, May 22, 2016, and concluded July 31. A second season, with thirteen episodes, aired from June 25 to September 11, 2017. From June 24 to August 26, 2018, a ten-episode third season aired. In November 2018, the series was renewed for a fourth and final ten-episode season, with production relocating to Australia, and the season airing from August 4 to September 29, 2019.

GraphicAudio audiobook series
In May 2020, all 98 issues of Garth Ennis' The Boys comic book series and the 8-issue epilogue series Dear Becky were adapted into seven full cast audiobooks produced by GraphicAudio, with all volumes numbering a combined 31 hours in length. In the second audiobook, the Preacher epilogue from "We Gotta Go Now" is adapted, with Michael John Casey voicing Proinsias Cassidy.

Legacy
Stephen King has said that his comic book series The Dark Tower: The Gunslinger Born, based on his The Dark Tower series of novels, was influenced by Preacher.

The character Yorick from Y: The Last Man, has a Zippo lighter with the words "Fuck Communism" engraved, identical to the one owned by Jesse Custer in Preacher. When asked about it he says it is "from this book I read once... a graphic novel. You know, like a comic book." The phrase originated as a 1963 satirical poster produced by The Realist magazine's Paul Krassner. This lighter appears later in the series when Yorick and Agent 355 are being held by Russian agents at gunpoint, who find the lighter and take offense to it.

In February 2009, an older now-human Proinsias Cassidy appears in a epilogue cameo role in the fourth volume of Garth Ennis' first ongoing comic book series after Preacher, the DC Comics (WildStorm)/Dynamite Entertainment series The Boys – "We Gotta Go Now" – in the twenty-seventh issue overall, depicted as a former friend and sponsor of Billy Butcher working as a bartender, clearing out his bar on St. Patrick's Day so that Billy can drink in peace while waiting for Wee Hughie Campbell.

IGN declared Preacher the third-greatest Vertigo comic, after The Saga of the Swamp Thing and The Sandman.

Jesse Custer was ranked the 11th Greatest Comic Book Character by Empire magazine. The Saint of Killers was ranked at number 42 on the same list.

References

External links

 Preacher at the Big Comic Book DataBase
 
 Analysing article at The Irish Journal of Gothic and Horror Studies

 
1995 comics debuts
Horror comics
Fantasy comics
Comics by Garth Ennis
Vertigo Comics titles
Western (genre) comics
DC Comics titles
Eisner Award winners for Best Continuing Series
Mythology in DC Comics
Fiction about God
Fiction about religion
Angels in popular culture
Comics adapted into television series
Cultural depictions of John Wayne
Comics set in Texas
Comics critical of religion
Fantasy Westerns